Cotton Glacier is a glacier about  long on the south side of the Clare Range, flowing eastward between Sperm Bluff and Queer Mountain, in Victoria Land. It was discovered by the Western Geological Party, led by Thomas Griffith Taylor, of the British Antarctic Expedition, 1910–13, and named by Taylor for Professor Leo A. Cotton, of the geology department of Sydney University. Cotton had earlier been a Summer Party member of the British Antarctic Expedition, 1907–09.

References 

Glaciers of Victoria Land
Scott Coast